Kalki is a Tamil-language weekly magazine published from Chennai, India. The magazine was established by Kalki Krishnamurthy, a popular Tamil novelist and Indian freedom fighter, in 1941. T Sadasivam was the magazine's co-founder. The magazine is known for its publication of historic novels such as Ponniyin Selvan and Sivagamiyin Sabadham. Singer Semmangudi Srinivasa Iyer, guru of M S Subbulakshmi, and music critic S V Seshadri were also involved with the magazine in its coverage of music.

Kalki Krishnamurthy also edited the magazine, which is published on a weekly basis. During his term the magazine was much more respected due to its quality. Mullum Malarum (authored by Umachandran), which won this magazine's first prize in the silver jubilee novel competition was first published in this magazine as a serial, and later made into a hit Tamil movie of the same name starring Rajnikanth.

References

External links
 

1941 establishments in India
Literary magazines published in India
Weekly magazines published in India
Magazines established in 1941
Mass media in Chennai
Tamil-language magazines